Whānau Ora (Māori for "healthy families") is a major contemporary indigenous health initiative in New Zealand, driven by Māori cultural values. Its core goal is to empower communities and extended families to support families within the community context rather than individuals within an institutional context.

History and objectives
Whānau Ora evolved out of the coalition between the National and Māori parties after the 2008 general election and became a cornerstone of the coalition agreement between them after the 2011 general election. Te Puni Kōkiri (the Ministry for Māori Development) stated in 2011 that:
Whānau Ora is an inclusive approach to providing services and opportunities to whānau across New Zealand. It empowers whānau as a whole, rather than focusing separately on individual whānau members and their problems.

Prior to the health initiative, Whānau Ora was the name of the Māori health awards.

Criticism 
The programme has been criticised for having hard to define and impossible to measure specific outputs; as well as a disproportionate amount of funding being spent in Turia's electorate. MP Winston Peters has been a vocal opponent of the program. The longest-established national Māori health organisation, the Māori Women's Welfare League choose not to participate in Whānau Ora, but some regional leaders are involved. The League operates a parenting skills course called Whanau Toko i te Ora, which is unrelated to Whānau Ora.

Ministerial oversight
Between April 2010 and September 2014, Māori Party co-leader Tariana Turia served as Minister for Whānau Ora. Between September 2014 and October 2017, the portfolio for Whānau Ora was occupied by Māori Party co-leader Te Ururoa Flavell.

References 
For technical reasons, many sources spell "Whānau Ora" without the macron.

External links 
 

Politics of New Zealand
Health in New Zealand